Stari Bar (lit. "Old Bar") is a small town in Montenegro. It is located inland, a few miles from the new city of Bar, resting on Londša hill, at the foot of Mount Rumija.  According to the 2003 census, the town has a population of 1,864 people.

History

In the Early Middle Ages, Antivari remained a subject of the Byzantine Empire, as part of the Theme of Dyrrhacium. Stefan Vojislav, incorporated it into his state in  1040, and his family till 1090, after which it became part of the medieval Serbian state culminating in the Empire under the Nemanjić dynasty. It was briefly annexed by the Republic of Venice. About 1360, the Balšić family of Zeta gained control of Bar as the Serbian Empire crumbled, after which Louis I of Hungary controlled Bar briefly before it was annexed by Venice again in 1443. Bar remained under the rule of Venice until it was taken by the Ottoman Empire in 1571 as part of the Ottoman expansion into Europe.

On 13 November 1877, during the Montenegrin–Ottoman War (1876–78), the town was besieged by forces under the command of Mašo Vrbica.  The defenses of the town were in the hands of Ibrahim Bey, who refused to surrender the town despite the Montenegrin heavy artillery bombardment, consisting of four Russian guns, and six Ottoman guns that had been seized at the Battle of Nikšić. The bombardment lasted over seven weeks and much of the town was destroyed.  On 5 January 1878, the Montenegrins detonated a 225 kg explosive inside the Bar Aqueduct which cut off the town's water supply. Ibrahim Bey surrendered the town on 9 January. The Bar peninsula and the town were awarded to the newly recognized Principality of Montenegro at the Congress of Berlin (1878).

After the 1979 Montenegro earthquake destroyed the aqueduct that supplied water to the town, the location was abandoned, and the new town of Bar constructed on the coast at the old port facilities. After the aqueduct was restored some years later, people began to return.

Demographics

Ethnicity in 2003

Sports
The local football club is Sloga who share the Stadion Topolica in Bar with FK Hajduk Bar and FK Mornar.

References

Populated places in Bar Municipality
Former capitals of Montenegro